Aydarali (Ayźaräle) is a rural locality (a selo) and the administrative centre of Aydaralinsky Selsoviet, Sterlibashevsky District, Bashkortostan, Russia. The population was 711 as of 2010. There are 5 streets.

Geography 
Aydarali is located 20 km southwest of Sterlibashevo (the district's administrative centre) by road. Artyukhovka is the nearest rural locality.

References 

Rural localities in Sterlibashevsky District